The 2001 St. Petersburg Open was a tennis tournament played on indoor hard courts at the Petersburg Sports and Concert Complex in Saint Petersburg in Russia and was part of the International Series of the 2001 ATP Tour. The tournament ran from October 22 through October 28, 2001.

Finals

Singles

 Marat Safin defeated  Rainer Schüttler 3–6, 6–3, 6–3
 It was Safin's 3rd title of the year and the 11th of his career.

Doubles

 Denis Golovanov /  Yevgeny Kafelnikov defeated  Irakli Labadze /  Marat Safin 7–5, 6–4
 It was Golovanov's only title of the year and the 1st of his career. It was Kafelnikov's 5th title of the year and the 48th of his career.

External links
 Official website  
 Official website 
 ATP Tournament Profile

St. Petersburg Open
St. Petersburg Open
St. Petersburg Open
St. Petersburg Open